Jay Edwards may refer to:
 Jay Edwards (basketball) (born 1969), American basketball player
 Jay Wade Edwards (born 1968), American film director and editor
 Jay Edwards (politician), member of the Ohio House of Representatives

See also
 Jason Edwards (disambiguation)
 Jaye Edwards